Katrina Anne Jolliffe  is an Australian  supramolecular and organic chemist and professor at the University of Sydney.

In 2002 Jolliffe was awarded an ARC fellowship at the University of Sydney. She was made a senior lecturer in 2007, promoted associate professor in 2008 and full professor in 2009. From 2013 to 2016 she was head of the school of chemistry.

Jolliffe is a Fellow of both the Royal Society of New South Wales and the Royal Australian Chemical Institute. In 2020 she was elected a Fellow of the Australian Academy of Science.

Selected works

References

External links 

 
 

Living people
Year of birth missing (living people)
University of New South Wales alumni
Academic staff of the University of Sydney
Australian chemists
Fellows of the Royal Society of New South Wales
Fellows of the Australian Academy of Science